Farlowella yarigui is a species of catfish in the family Loricariidae. It is native to South America, where it occurs in the Topón River, which is part of the middle Magdalena River basin in Colombia. It is only found in the vicinity of partially submerged vegetation and pieces of wood, with the species being absent in other microhabitats within the main channel of the Topón. It is known to occur alongside the species Astyanax caucanus, Astyanax magdalenae, Astyanax filiferus, Lasiancistrus caucanus, and Roeboides dayi, as well as members of the genera Chaetostoma, Creagrutus, Hemibrycon, and Sturisoma. The species reaches 11.2 cm (4.4 inches) in standard length and is believed to be a facultative air-breather.

References 

Fish described in 2014
yarigui
Catfish of South America
Fish of Colombia